The Barbuda Independence Movement was a political party in Antigua and Barbuda. The party was formed in 1988 by Arthur Nibbs. It participated in the 1989 general elections, but received only 71 votes (0.3% of the total) and failed to win a seat. It did not contest another election.

References

Defunct political parties in Antigua and Barbuda
Political parties established in 1988
1988 establishments in Antigua and Barbuda
Political parties with year of disestablishment missing
Independence movements
Separatism in Antigua and Barbuda
Barbuda political parties